Isabel Margarita Ordetx y Cruz Prieto was a Cuban writer, poet, and feminist activist. She contributed to various publications of her country as a chronicler, including Heraldo de Cuba, La Discusión, El Fígaro, la Bohemia, América, Las Antillas, and Arte. Revista Universal.

She was also editor of La Mujer, together with Aída Peláez de Villa Urrutia and Domitila García de Coronado. She launched the women's magazine Vanidades with Josefina Mosquera in 1937, and was its editor-in-chief from 1937 to 1952.

References

20th-century Cuban poets
Cuban editors
Cuban women poets
Cuban women's rights activists
Year of birth missing
Year of death missing
20th-century Cuban women writers